Big Red was the machine with which American Don Vesco took the motorcycle land-speed record, on September 17, 1970 at the Bonneville Salt Flats in Utah.

The following year, with the five and a half meter long motorcycle built from an aircraft drop tank, he undertook several more attempts to break the  record set by Robert Leppan in 1966. A month later, the record was broken again: Cal Rayborn reached an averaged  in two runs in opposite directions.

The bike is now an exhibit of the Barber Vintage Motorsports Museum.

References

External links 

 

Motorcycles of the United States
Land speed record motorcycles
Feet forwards motorcycles
Streamliner motorcycles
Motorcycles designed by Don Vesco